Prospect Mountain may refer to:

 Prospect Mountain (Alabama)
 Prospect Mountain (Alberta)
 Prospect Mountain (Conejos County, Colorado)
 Prospect Mountain (Lake County, Colorado)
 Prospect Mountain (Larimer County, Colorado)
 Prospect Mountain (Connecticut)
 Prospect Mountain (Idaho)
 Prospect Mountain (Minnesota)
 Prospect Mountain (Belknap County, New Hampshire)
 Prospect Mountain (Carroll County, New Hampshire)
 Prospect Mountain (Coos County, New Hampshire)
 Prospect Mountain (Lancaster, New Hampshire)
 Prospect Mountain (Nevada)
 Prospect Mountain (Broome County, New York)
 Prospect Mountain (Essex County, New York)
 Prospect Mountain (Orange County, New York)
 Prospect Mountain (Warren County, New York)
 Prospect Mountain (Oregon)
 Prospect Mountain (Vermont)
 Prospect Mountain (Wyoming)